Savignia eskovi is a species of sheet weavers found in Russia. It was described by Marusik, Koponen & Danilov in 2001.

References

Linyphiidae
Spiders described in 2001
Spiders of Russia